William Mathews (1828–1901) was an English mountaineer, botanist, land agent and surveyor, who first proposed the formation of the Alpine Club of London in 1857.

Early life
He was the eldest of six sons of Jeremiah Mathews, a Worcestershire land agent, and his wife Mary Guest. Of his brothers, Charles Edward Mathews (1834–1905) and George Spencer Mathews (1836–1904) were also noted mountaineers. William was educated at St John's College, Cambridge.

Founding of the Alpine Club
Mathews had corresponded with F. J. A. Hort about the idea of founding a national mountaineering club in February 1857 and took the idea up with E. S. Kennedy on an ascent of the Finsteraarhorn on 13 August 1857 (the fifth ascent of the mountain and the first British ascent). Ad hoc meetings at Mathews's house near Birmingham proceeded during November, and the meeting at which the Alpine Club was founded took place on 22 December 1857 at Ashley's Hotel in London, chaired by Kennedy.

First ascents
Grande Casse with guides Michel Croz and E. Favre on 8 August 1860 
Castor with F. W. Jacomb and Michel Croz on 23 August 1861 
Monte Viso with F. W. Jacomb and Michel Croz on 30 August 1861
Grandes Rousses with Thomas George Bonney, and Michel Croz with his brother Jean-Baptiste Croz in 1863

Publications
'Mechanical properties of ice, and their relation to glacier motion', by William Mathews, President of the Alpine Club, in Nature, 24 March 1870
The Flora of Algeria: considered in relation to the physical history of the Mediterranean region and supposed submergence of the Sahara (London: Edward Stanford, 1880)

References

1828 births
1901 deaths
Alumni of St John's College, Cambridge
19th-century British botanists
English mountain climbers
Presidents of the Alpine Club (UK)